Matthew Joseph Hanousek (born August 16, 1963) is a former American football offensive lineman who played one season with the Seattle Seahawks of the National Football League (NFL). He first enrolled at Drake University before transferring to the Utah State University. He attended St. Thomas Academy in Mendota Heights, Minnesota.

Professional career
Hanousek spent the 1987 off-season with the Seattle Seahawks of the NFL and was released by the team on August 25, 1987. He was re-signed by the Seahawks as a replacement player on September 23, 1987 during the NFL players' strike. He started all three of the Seahawks games involving replacement players during the 1987 season.

References

External links
Just Sports Stats

Living people
1963 births
Players of American football from Saint Paul, Minnesota
American football offensive linemen
Drake Bulldogs football players
Utah State Aggies football players
Seattle Seahawks players
National Football League replacement players
American people of Czech descent
American people of European descent